Professional Children's School (PCS) is a not-for-profit, college preparatory school geared toward working and aspiring child actors and dancers in grades six through twelve. The school was founded in New York City in 1914 to provide an academic education to young people working on the New York stage, in Vaudeville, or "on the road".

PCS was co-founded by Jean Greer and Jane Harris Hall when they learned that children who were working in entertainment were not able to attend traditional school. The school's original premises were at The Rehearsal Club on West 45th Street in Midtown before it moved to 1860 Broadway, near West 61st Street on the Upper West Side. Its curriculum and hours have changed over time.

Distinguished alumni

Dance

 Jerry Ames
 Jared Angle
 Tyler Angle
 Alexandra Ansanelli
 Merrill Ashley
 Debra Austin
 Peter Boal
 Ruthanna Boris
 Ashley Bouder
 Leslie Browne
 Fernando Bujones
 Emily Coates
 Daniel Duell
 Megan Fairchild
 Robert Fairchild
 Suzanne Farrell
 Eliot Feld
 Savion Glover
 Susan Hendl
 Adam Hendrickson
 Darla Hoover
 Sterling Hyltin
 Allegra Kent
 Gelsey Kirkland
 Darci Kistler
 Maria Kowroski
 Carla Körbes
 Rebecca Krohn
 Lourdes Lopez
 Savannah Lowery
 Nilas Martins
 Steven Melendez
 Colleen Neary
 Kyra Nichols
 Tiler Peck
 Susan Pilarre
 Rachel Piskin
 Teresa Reichlen
 Nancy Reynolds
 Carrie Lee Riggins
 Jenifer Ringer
 John Selya
Jennie Somogyi
 Ethan Stiefel
 Marianna Tcherkassky
 Ashley Tuttle
 Sheryl Ware
 Heather Watts
 Wendy Whelan
 Deborah Wingert

Music

 Loni Ackerman
 Anastacia
 Jack Antonoff
 Emanuel Ax
 Jessie Baylin
 Vanessa Carlton
 Kyung Wha Chung
 Dana Dawson
 Peng-Peng Gong
 Andreas Haefliger
 Marvin Hamlisch
 Lorin Hollander
 Caroline Jones
 Ida Kavafian
 Cho-Liang Lin
 Frankie Lymon
 Yo-Yo Ma
 Jack Metzger
 Midori Gotō
 Buddy Rich
 Beverly Sills
 Arlene Smith
 Martha Strongin Katz
 Conrad Tao
 Pinchas Zukerman

Theater, film, and television

 Brooke Adams
 Trini Alvarado
 Adam Arkin
 Alex Paez
 Essence Atkins
 Kaye Ballard
 Mischa Barton
 Bonnie Bedelia
 Milton Berle
 Zina Bethune
 Nadia Bjorlin
 Tempestt Bledsoe
 Joan Blondell
 Ann Blyth
 Laura Bell Bundy
 Eddie Bracken
 Irene Cara
 Phoebe Cates
 Miles Chapin 
 Kathleen Cody
 Holly Marie Combs
 Kieran Culkin
 Macaulay Culkin
 Rory Culkin
 Charlotte d'Amboise
 Alexandra Daddario
 Sandra Dee
 Brandon deWilde
 Barrett Doss
 Giancarlo Esposito
 Donald Faison
 Carrie Fisher
 Anne Francis
 Rebecca Gayheart
 Helen Gallagher
 Sarah Michelle Gellar
 Elliott Gould
 Todd Graff
 Karron Graves
 Lukas Haas
 Albert Hackett
 Anthony Michael Hall
 Huntz Hall
 Patti Hansen
 Melissa Joan Hart
 Amy Irving
 Scarlett Johansson
 Brad Caleb Kane
 Carol Kane
 Ruby Keeler
 Jean Louisa Kelly
 Patsy Kelly
 Jane Krakowski
 Ricki Lake
 Diane Lane
 Jennifer Lien
 Peggy Lipton
 Lorna Luft
 Sidney Lumet
 Ida Lupino
 Helen Mack
 Jena Malone
 Nancy Malone
 Daniel Mann
 Patty McCormack
 Leighton Meester
 Lisa Mordente
 Rita Moreno
 Phyllis Newman
 Jerry O'Connell
 Donald O'Connor
 Jennifer O'Neill
 Sarah Jessica Parker
 Martha Plimpton
 Laura Prepon
 Martha Raye
 Tara Reid
 Rosemary Rice
 Christina Ricci
 Eden Riegel
 Tanya Rivero
 Christy Carlson Romano
 Rose Marie
 Sara Rue
 Michael Rupert
 Rebecca Schaeffer
 Aaron Schwartz
 Shim Eun-kyung
 Jonathan Silverman
 Penny Singleton
 Christian Slater
 John Spencer
 Julia Stiles
 Susan Strasberg
 Eddie Kaye Thomas
 Uma Thurman
 Rachel Ticotin
 Ashley Tisdale
 Janine Turner
 Leslie Uggams
 Dick Van Patten
 Joyce Van Patten
 Christopher Walken
 Nancy Walker
 Malcolm-Jamal Warner
 Lesley Ann Warren
 Tuesday Weld
 Nat Wolff
 Lee Thompson Young

Sports

 Kristie Ahn
 Carol Heiss
 Reed Kessler
 Sonya Klopfer
 Yvonne Sherman
 Ashima Shiraishi
 Josh Waitzkin

Literature
 Michael McGarrity
 Linn Ullmann

Fashion
 Rachel Antonoff
 Claudia Mason
 Vera Wang
 Lily Chee
 Paris Hilton

See also
Professional Performing Arts School
Fiorello H. LaGuardia High School of Music & Art and Performing Arts

References

External links
 Official site

Educational institutions established in 1914
High schools in New York City
Middle schools in New York City
Schools of the performing arts in the United States
Private schools in New York City
Columbus Circle
Professionalism
1914 establishments in New York City